Doctor Spartacus Dandridge is a fictional character appearing in British comic anthology 2000 AD, created by Alec Worley and Warren Pleece. First appearing in a Past Imperfect story  in 2009, Dandridge has since become a ghost tracking and destroying evil spirits and poltergeist, aided by his assistant, Shelley.

Characters 

 Doctor Spartacus Dandridge - A ghost hunter
 Shelley - Dandridge's assistant

Bibliography

 Past Imperfect: Antiquus Phantasma  (with Warren Pleece, in 2000 AD #1631, 2009)
 Dandridge
 Return of the Chap  (with Warren Pleece, in 2000 AD #1710-1714, 2010)
 The House That Dripped Devilry!  (with Warren Pleece, in 2000 AD #1726-1730, 2011)
 A Christmas Ghost Story  (with Warren Pleece, in 2000 AD #2012, 2011)
 The Copper Conspiracy  (with Warren Pleece, in 2000 AD #1824-1831, 2013)

References 

Comics characters introduced in 2009
Dandridge, Doctor Spartacus
2000 AD comic strips
2000 AD characters